Astragalus tricarinatus is a rare species of milkvetch known by the common name triplerib milkvetch, or triple-ribbed milkvetch.

It is endemic to California, where it can be found in the region where the San Bernardino Mountains meet the Mojave Desert and the Colorado Desert. It grows in desert scrub and expanses of rock litter amongst stands of Joshua trees. The plant is known from only one location and there were twenty individuals remaining there in 1998, when it was federally listed as an endangered species.

Description

The pod is curved and has three distinct ribs.

References

External links
Jepson Manual Treatment of Astragalus tricarinatus
Status Evaluation of Astragalus tricarinatus.
Astragalus tricarinatus — UC Photo gallery

tricarinatus
Endemic flora of California
Flora of the California desert regions
Flora of the Sonoran Deserts
Natural history of the Mojave Desert
Natural history of the Colorado Desert
Natural history of San Bernardino County, California
Plants described in 1877
NatureServe critically imperiled species
Critically endangered flora of California